Hassan Usman Katsina Polytechnic (HUKP) is a state polytechnic in Katsina, established in 1983.

RECOGNITION
Hassan Usman Katsina Polytechnic (HUKP) was ranked among the top 38 schools in Nigeria according to The National Board for Technical Education NBTE. HUKP is accredited by the Longman Dictionary of Contemporary English, a professional body of Science Technologists, under the supervision of the Nigerian Ministry of Science and Technology.

References

External links
 
 
 Accreditation Info: Type: Polytechnic  SN:22  Status: Accredited

 
Katsina State
Educational institutions established in 1983
1983 establishments in Nigeria
Polytechnics in Nigeria
Public universities in Nigeria